Novi Strilyshcha is an urban-type settlement in Lviv Raion, Lviv Oblast (region) of western Ukraine. It belongs to Bibrka urban hromada, one of the hromadas of Ukraine. Local government is administered by Novi Strilyshcha settlement council. Population: . 

The first written mention of which dates from the year 1375, still just Strilyshcha (now the village of Stari Strilyshcha) who were on the verge of a border settlement between Galician and Zvenyhorod principalities.

In 1513, new settlement was separated from Strilyshcha and named Novi Strilyshcha. Thanks to the convenient location on the trade route from Bibrka to Rohatyn town began to grow, getting the right to hold four annual fairs and weekly markets. In the 17th century Novi Strilyshcha even enjoyed municipal rights.

During the Soviet era to 1959, were subregional center in Drohobych Oblast.

Up to now there have preserved the 17th-century church and the Church of the Assumption of the Blessed Virgin. Nearby the village is a museum of the Ukrainian Insurgent Army (UPA), dedicated to hundreds of Siromantsi (a unit of the UPA) and specially to a native of Strilyshcha, Mykola Lebed.

Until 18 July 2020, Novi Strilyshcha belonged to Zhydachiv Raion. The raion was abolished in July 2020 as part of the administrative reform of Ukraine, which reduced the number of raions of Lviv Oblast to seven. The area of Zhydachiv Raion was merged into Stryi Raion, however, Novi Strilyshcha was transferred to Lviv Raion.

References 

Urban-type settlements in Stryi Raion